The Erdini (Έρδινοι) or Erpeditani (Έρπεδιτανοι) were a people of referred to in Ptolemy's 2nd century Geography as living in the north-west of Ireland, in the area of Donegal Bay.

References

Prehistoric Ireland
Tribes of ancient Ireland